7-Carboxy-7-deazaguanine synthase (EC 4.3.99.3, 7-carboxy-7-carbaguanine synthase, queE (gene)) is an enzyme with systematic name 6-carboxy-5,6,7,8-tetrahydropterin ammonia-lyase. This enzyme catalyses the following chemical reaction

 6-carboxy-5,6,7,8-tetrahydropterin  7-carboxy-7-carbaguanine + NH3

The enzyme is a member of the superfamily of S-adenosyl-L-methionine-dependent radical enzymes.

References

External links 
 

EC 4.3.99